Codicil may refer to:

 Codicil (will),  subsequent change or modification of terms made and appended to an existing trust or will and testament
 A modification of terms made and appended to an existing constitution, treaty, or standard form contract
 Any addition or appendix, such as a corollary to a theorem

See also
 CODASYL